Waukesha Metro Transit is a public transit agency operating in the city of Waukesha and throughout Waukesha County. Founded in 1983, the system directly operates ten bus routes, contracts three commuter routes to Wisconsin Coach Lines, and partially funds two routes of Milwaukee County Transit System which extend into Waukesha County.

Waukesha Metro is also one of six transit agencies that are part of the Southeast Wisconsin Transit System.

Services

Downtown Transit Center
The Downtown Transit Center is located in downtown Waukesha at 212 East Saint Paul Ave. The center replaced the former transfer center, which was crowded on a road between the Fox River and the back end of buildings along West Main St. It serves as the central transfer point for 12 routes of the system's routes. It opened in October 2004 and provides an indoor waiting area, restrooms, 13 covered bus bays, a drivers’ lounge, and a customer service area. The Downtown Transit Center also includes a two-floor parking ramp for 460 vehicles. The opening was originally planned for late summer of 2004, however, this was delayed due to WisDOT complaints that adjacent streets would be converted from one-way to two way in order to improve access and safety. These improvements eventually were allowed, and the center opened under the $16 million budget. The City of Waukesha implemented security upgrades to the Downtown Transit Center in 2017 and 2018.

Ridership

In a October 2022 newsletter, the Southeastern Wisconsin Regional Planning Commission reported that Waukesha Metro Transit "performs very well", but recommends possible straightening of some routes if ridership doesn't return to pre-pandemic levels.

See also
 List of bus transit systems in the United States
 List of intercity bus stops in Wisconsin
 Milwaukee County Transit System
 Washington County Commuter Express

References

External links
 Official website

Bus transportation in Wisconsin
Intermodal transportation authorities in Wisconsin
Transportation in Waukesha County, Wisconsin